The Goupitan shiplift is a ship lift system on the Wu River, a tributary of the Yangtze River in Guizhou Province, southwest of China. A system of three boat lifts supplements the Goupitan Dam in order to provide shipping along the river.

The designed capacity of the system is 2.928 million tons of cargo per year. The construction of the ship lift system was carried out after the completion of the power plant, it was completed in 2021, the cost of building the system was US$777.51 million. The structure of its facilities, in their order from downstream:
 Concrete bridge aqueduct for the passage of ships to the ship lift of the second level;
 Aqueduct of the second level for the passage of ships;
 Tunnel for the passage of ships from the aqueduct of the second level towards the upstream;
 Vertical boat lift of the upstream pool, the height of the descent can change along with the water level in the reservoir and can reach .

See also 
 The Geheyan Dam with similar boat lifting system

References 

Boat lifts
Rivers of Guizhou